Bend is a census-designated place in Tehama County, California, United States. Bend had a post office from 1897 to 1935. The community was originally known as Horsethief Bend; the name was changed to Sander's Bend and later shortened to Bend. The community was named after a nearby meander in the Sacramento River. The population was 619 at the 2010 census.

Geography
According to the United States Census Bureau, the CDP covers an area of 3.1 square miles (8.2 km2), 2.9 square miles (7.6 km2) of it land and 0.3 square miles (0.7 km2) of it (8.07%) water.

Demographics

The 2010 United States Census reported that Bend had a population of 619. The racial makeup of Bend was 570 (92.1%) White, 4 (0.6%) African American, 15 (2.4%) Native American, 3 (0.5%) Asian, 0 (0.0%) Pacific Islander, 14 (2.3%) from other races, and 13 (2.1%) from two or more races. Hispanic or Latino of any race were 48 persons (7.8%).

The Census reported that 619 people (100% of the population) lived in households, 0 (0%) lived in non-institutionalized group quarters, and 0 (0%) were institutionalized.

There were 250 households, out of which 67 (26.8%) had children under the age of 18 living in them, 165 (66.0%) were opposite-sex married couples living together, 10 (4.0%) had a female householder with no husband present, 11 (4.4%) had a male householder with no wife present.  There were 15 (6.0%) unmarried opposite-sex partnerships, and 2 (0.8%) same-sex married couples or partnerships. 51 households (20.4%) were made up of individuals, and 22 (8.8%) had someone living alone who was 65 years of age or older. The average household size was 2.48.  There were 186 families (74.4% of all households); the average family size was 2.80.

The population was spread out, with 125 people (20.2%) under the age of 18, 29 people (4.7%) aged 18 to 24, 132 people (21.3%) aged 25 to 44, 191 people (30.9%) aged 45 to 64, and 142 people (22.9%) who were 65 years of age or older.  The median age was 48.3 years. For every 100 females, there were 105.6 males.  For every 100 females age 18 and over, there were 107.6 males.

The homeowner vacancy rate was 1.4%; the rental vacancy rate was 6.4%.  512 people (82.7% of the population) lived in owner-occupied housing units and 107 people (17.3%) lived in rental housing units.

References

Census-designated places in Tehama County, California
Census-designated places in California